Barry James Young (born 12 October 1975) is an English former cricketer. He was a right-handed batsman who played for Bedfordshire County Cricket Club. He was born in Luton.

Young made a single List A appearance for the team, during the 1997 NatWest Trophy. From the lower order, he scored 30 not out.

References

1975 births
Living people
English cricketers
Bedfordshire cricketers